Polyhalite is an evaporite mineral, a hydrated sulfate of potassium, calcium and magnesium with formula: . Polyhalite crystallizes in the triclinic system, although crystals are very rare. The normal habit is massive to fibrous. It is typically colorless, white to gray, although it may be brick red due to iron oxide inclusions. It has a Mohs hardness of 3.5 and a specific gravity of 2.8.

It occurs in sedimentary marine evaporites and is a major potassium ore mineral in the Carlsbad deposits of New Mexico.  It is also present as a 2–3% contaminant of Himalayan salt.

Polyhalite was first described in 1818 for specimens from its type locality in Salzburg, Austria.

Despite the similarity in names between polyhalite and halite (the naturally occurring form of table salt), their only connection is that both are evaporite minerals. The use of the Greek words for many and salt in polyhalite is due to polyhalite consisting of several metals that can form salts in the more general sense of the word salt used in chemistry.

Production 

In 2010, the first mining operations of the polyhalite mineral commenced at Boulby Mine, the mine is currently the only producer of polyhalite which is marketed by Israel Chemicals as Polysulphate. In 2016, Sirius Minerals announced plans for the Woodsmith Mine, a new polyhalite mine in the area. In March 2020, the project was taken over by Anglo American plc.

Composition and use
Polyhalite is used as a fertilizer since it contains four important nutrients and is low in chloride:
48%  as sulfate
14%  as from sulfate of potash
6% MgO as from magnesium sulfate
17% CaO as from calcium sulfate

References

Magnesium minerals
Calcium minerals
Potassium minerals
Sulfate minerals
Triclinic minerals
Evaporite
Potash
Minerals in space group 2